The 1893 Kalamazoo football team was an American football team that represented Kalamazoo College in the 1893 college football season.

Schedule

References

Kalamazoo
Kalamazoo Hornets football seasons
College football winless seasons
Kalamazoo football